Pedro Miguel Barbosa Queirós (born 8 August 1984) is a Portuguese professional footballer who plays for F.C. Tirsense as a right back.

Club career
Born in Santo Tirso, Porto District, Queirós played lower league or amateur football until the age of 24, when he signed for Romanian club AF Gloria Bistrița in summer 2008. He returned to his country in the following transfer window, joining F.C. Paços de Ferreira but being rarely played during his spell, which also included a loan to U.D. Oliveirense from the Segunda Liga.

Queirós returned to the Primeira Liga in the 2011–12 season, being first choice for C.D. Feirense but suffering relegation as second from last. He scored his first and only goal in the competition on 29 April 2012, in a 4–0 away win against U.D. Leiria who only fielded eight players in protest of their economic situation.

Queirós was also a starter in the next three top-flight campaigns, with Vitória de Setúbal where he was also team captain. In July 2015 the 30-year-old returned to Romania and its Liga I, signing with FC Astra Giurgiu and winning his first major trophy in his only season.

Queirós alternated between the Portuguese top division and the second tier in the following three years, with G.D. Chaves and G.D. Estoril Praia. On 10 July 2019 he returned to former side Tirsense, who now competed in the Porto regional leagues.

Honours
Astra Giurgiu
Liga I: 2015–16

References

External links

Football-Lineups profile

1984 births
Living people
People from Santo Tirso
Portuguese footballers
Association football defenders
Primeira Liga players
Liga Portugal 2 players
Segunda Divisão players
F.C. Tirsense players
S.C. Braga B players
F.C. Paços de Ferreira players
U.D. Oliveirense players
C.D. Feirense players
Vitória F.C. players
G.D. Chaves players
G.D. Estoril Praia players
Liga I players
ACF Gloria Bistrița players
FC Astra Giurgiu players
Portuguese expatriate footballers
Expatriate footballers in Romania
Portuguese expatriate sportspeople in Romania
Sportspeople from Porto District